Endubis or Endybis was a late-3rd-century sovereign of the Kingdom of Aksum in East Africa (modern-day Ethiopia and Eritrea). He was among the earliest rulers in the Horn of Africa to mint his own coins; the Aksumite currency of his reign was issued in gold and silver denominations and bore inscriptions in Koine Greek.

The coins of Endubis are dated to c. 295 to c. 310 and are "undoubtedly [...] the oldest Aksumite coins". The development of Aksumite coins being struck was closely linked with developments in the Roman empire during the third century. Currency reforms took place during the reign of Diocletian, who reorganised the issuing of gold coins in 286 and silver coins in 294, the latter after having been suspended for several decades. As such, it is likely that the coins of Endubis, which were minted in gold, silver and copper, do not date to before c. 295.

Coins of Endubis show two mottos engraved in Greek:
 "ENΔYBIC BACIΛEYC" – "King Endybis"
 "AξωMITω BICIΔAXY" – "of the Aksumites, man of Daku", or "bisi Dakhu". This is the first appearance of the title "bisi", which Stuart Munro-Hay believed is related to the Ge'ez word "be'esya", "man of".

On some coins he described himself as "ΑΞΩΜΙΤΩ ΒΑϹΙΛΕΥϹ", "king of Axum".

Gallery

References

External links
 Page with coin struck under Endubis

Kings of Axum
3rd-century monarchs in Africa